White Moth is the fourth studio album by Australian multi-instrumentalist Xavier Rudd. "Better People" was released as the first single taken from the album.  White Moth is Rudd's first album with the ANTI- record company.  The album peaked at #30 on the Billboard Heatseekers album chart in June.

White Moth'''s success earned an ARIA Music Awards nomination for Best Blues and Roots Album at the 2007 ceremony, but lost to John Butler Trio's multi-platinum Grand National''.

Content
The official Xavier Rudd online store had this to say about the album:

Track listing

Charts

Certifications

References

2007 albums
Xavier Rudd albums